Luis Humberto Fuentes Jiménez (born 21 March 1995) is a Chilean footballer who plays for Segunda División Profesional de Chile side Deportes Valdivia as a midfielder.

Personal life
He is a twin brother of the footballer Juan Fuentes.

Honours
General Velásquez
Tercera A: 2017

References

External links
 
 Profile at O'Higgins official website

1995 births
Living people
People from Rancagua
People from Cachapoal Province
People from O'Higgins Region
Chilean footballers
O'Higgins F.C. footballers
Deportes Colchagua footballers
General Velásquez footballers
Deportes Vallenar footballers
Lautaro de Buin footballers
Cobreloa footballers
Deportes Valdivia footballers
Chilean Primera División players
Segunda División Profesional de Chile players
Primera B de Chile players
Association football midfielders